Greek is an opera in two acts composed by Mark-Anthony Turnage to a libretto adapted by Turnage and Jonathan Moore from Steven Berkoff's 1980 verse play Greek. The play and the opera are a re-telling of Sophocles's Greek tragedy Oedipus Rex with the setting changed to the East End of London in the 1980s. The opera was first performed on 17 June 1988 in the Carl-Orff-Saal of the Gasteig, Munich, in a co-production by the Munich Biennale, the Edinburgh International Festival and the BBC.

Background and performance history
Turnage composed Greek between 1986 and 1988 as a commission from the City of Munich for one of five new operas to premiere at the first Munich Biennale. The commission was suggested by the Biennale's founder, German composer Hans Werner Henze, who had taught Turnage at the Tanglewood Music Center and admired his work. Turnage adapted Berkoff's play for the libretto with the help of Jonathan Moore who would be the stage director of the premiere production. The adaptation involved shortening the play, re-ordering some of its text, and the addition of a police riot scene not in Berkoff's original.

Sian Edwards conducted the world premiere of Greek on 17 June 1988 in the Carl-Orff-Saal of the Munich Gasteig. The production was directed by Jonathan Moore with sets and costumes by David Blight, and lighting by Kevin Sleep. Greek ran for two more performances at the Biennale on 18 and 19 June, and received its UK premiere the following month at the Edinburgh Festival. This production was revived two years later for performances at English National Opera. In 1990 the BBC filmed a television version of Greek at the Liverpool Warehouse with the original world premiere cast and the Almeida Ensemble. The production, directed by Peter Maniura and Jonathan Moore and conducted by Richard Bernas, won the Royal Philharmonic Society Award for Best Broadcast (Radio or Television).

The first fully staged production of Greek in Australia took place at the Chamber Made Theatre in Melbourne on 13 June 1991. That same year it premiered in Italy at the Montepulciano Festival on 1 August. Further national premieres followed in the second half of the 1990s: Netherlands (Stadsschouwburg, Amsterdam, 3 January 1996); Austria (Odeon, Vienna, 20 October 1996); and the United States (Aspen Music Festival, 23 July 1998. Among its 21st century performances in the UK were two tours by Music Theatre Wales in autumn 2011 (which included the Buxton Festival) and autumn 2013. In 2017 Edinburgh International Festival and Scottish Opera created a new production, performing in Edinburgh and Glasgow, as well as the opera's New York premiere at Brooklyn Academy of Music. The first staged performance to be seen in Chicago was produced by the Chicago Opera Vanguard company in May 2009.

Roles and instrumentation

The opera was written for a cast of four singers, sharing eleven roles:

The original productions of the play of the same name by Steven Berkoff on which the opera is based followed a similar division of roles:
Eddy, Fortune-teller
Dad, Manager of cafe
Wife, Doreen, Waitress 1
Mum, Sphinx, Waitress 2
In addition to the singers the opera also has roles for four actors with speaking parts.

The instrumental ensemble consists of:

 flute (doubling alto flute, piccolo)
 2 oboes (both doubling cor anglais)
 2 clarinets in B (no. 1 doubling clarinet in E, bass clarinet, no. 2 doubling bass clarinet)
 soprano saxophone (doubling alto saxophone, baritone saxophone)
 trumpet in C
 trombone
 percussion (1 or 2 players)
 harp
 piano (doubling electronic piano)
 viola
 3 cellos
 double bass

As well as their own instruments all of the players are required to play a varied and exotic selection of percussion instruments, such as bodhrán, tom-tom, ratchet, police whistle and large metal dustbin lid.

Recording
A recording featuring the original cast conducted by Richard Bernas was released on the Argo Records label in 1994.  It was re-released by Decca in 2002.

References

Sources

Further reading
Byrne, John, "Mark-Anthony Turnage's Greek at the RNCM", Musical Opinion, July 2000 (subscription access)
Fowler, John, "Controversial Festival opera faces crisis", The Glasgow Herald, 18 July 1988, p. 4
Pettitt, Stephen, Mark-Anthony Turnage and Greek, The Musical Times, Vol. 129, No. 1746 (August 1988), pp. 397–400
Service, Tom, "Turnage weekend", The Guardian, 20 January 2003

English-language operas
Operas
Operas by Mark-Anthony Turnage
1988 operas
Operas set in London
Operas based on classical mythology
Operas based on plays
Operas based on works by Sophocles
Works based on Oedipus Rex
Modern adaptations of works by Sophocles